Jefferson G. Thurber was a Democratic politician from Michigan who served in both houses of the Michigan Legislature.

Thurber represented Monroe County in the Michigan House of Representatives and the Senate between 1844 and 1852, and was the Speaker of the House during the 16th Legislatuare. He was also a delegate to the 1856 Democratic National Convention which nominated James Buchanan over the incumbent, President Franklin Pierce.

References

1807 births
1857 deaths
Democratic Party Michigan state senators
Speakers of the Michigan House of Representatives
Democratic Party members of the Michigan House of Representatives
People from Unity, New Hampshire
People from Monroe, Michigan
19th-century American politicians